The genealogical order of the rulers of Ancient Moirang till the modern day Moirang, were recorded in many manuscripts including the  and other historical documents associated with the Moirang Kangleirol.

Mythological rulers 
Due to the lack of exact historical datings, the first recorded seven rulers, just before the rulers with dated reigns, were considered to be mythological rather than being historical.

Historical rulers 
The recorded historical dates of the reigns of the rulers started from 52 BC when Emperor Phang Phang ascended the throne of Ancient Moirang kingdom.

Bibliography 

 https://archive.org/details/in.ernet.dli.2015.465405

References 

Meitei culture
History of Manipur
Pages with unreviewed translations